Brickellia ambigens is a North American species of flowering plants in the family Asteraceae. It is native to Lincoln County, New Mexico.

References

External links
photo of herbarium specimen at Missouri Botanical Garden, type specimen of Coleosanthus ambigens/Brickellia ambigens

ambigens
Flora of New Mexico
Plants described in 1898